Women in the World was a live journalism platform that was produced from 2010 to 2020, founded by Tina Brown to 'discover and amplify the unheard voices of global women on the front lines of change,'

Women in the World Annual Summit
First held at New York’s Hudson Theater, and thereafter at Lincoln Center’s David Koch Theater, the summit convened women leaders, activists and political change-makers from around the world to share their stories, and offer solutions to building a better life for women and girls. Former ABC news producer Kyle Gibson was senior executive producer and managing editor of the event.

The inaugural summit took place from March 12–14, 2010 and included appearances by Queen Rania of Jordan, Meryl Streep, Valerie Jarrett, Christine Lagarde, Hillary Clinton, Madeleine K. Albright, Nora Ephron, and Katie Couric. At the second summit, held from March 10–12, 2011, participants included Hillary Clinton, Dr. Hawa Abdi, Condoleezza Rice, Sheryl Sandberg, Dr. Ngozi Okonjo-Iweala, Diane Von Furstenberg, Melinda Gates, Ashley Judd and more.

The three-day summit at Lincoln Center was attended annually by more than 2,500 ticket buyers. Other featured guests included Angelina Jolie, Oprah Winfrey, Nobel Peace Prize laureate Maria Ressa, Nobel Peace Prize laureate Leymah Gbowee, Barbra Streisand, Nancy Pelosi, Gloria Steinem, Zainab Salbi, Christiane Amanpour, Justin Trudeau, Masih Alinejad, Nikki Haley, Lynsey Addario, Cecile Richards, Priyanka Chopra, Melinda Gates, Chimanada Ngozi Adiche, Nicholas Kristof, Ajay Banga and Anna Wintour.

"Progress, one conference at a time... Women in the World, which features women from diverse cultures and backgrounds, brings in celebrities, media stars and fashion figures. Since it started in 2010, it has leaped to the forefront of the scene, drawing thousands of chief executives, world leaders, artists and activists to a tightly packed program at Lincoln Center," wrote Luisita Lopez Torregrosa in The New York Times.

In 2012, Women in the World expanded outside of the U.S. with a summit held in São Paulo, Brazil. Between 2012 and 2019 Women in the World hosted summits and salons in New Delhi, Toronto, London and Dubai, as well as Washington DC, San Antonio Texas, Dallas, Los Angeles and Miami.

Beginning with the 2012 summit, Toyota and Women in the World partnered for the “Mothers of Invention” series. Honorees included: Asenath Andrews of the Catherine Ferguson Academy, Talia Leman of RandomKid.org, and Jessica Matthews and Julia Silverman of sOccket. In 2013, honorees included Kavita M. Shukla of FreshPaper, Sejal Hathi and Tara Roberts of Girltank, and Caitria and Morgan O’Neill of Recovers.org. In January 2014, Toyota and Women in the World announced Anna Stork and Andrea Sreshta, co-founders of the LuminAid, as the first of three 2014 Mothers of Invention honorees.

Other partners included Mastercard, AT&T and Bank of America.

The Women in the World Summit was closed down by the Covid-19 pandemic of 2020.

The Women in the World Foundation
The Women in the World Foundation launched in September 2011.

In 2013 the Foundation expanded its partnership with the non-profit Vital Voices Global Partnership. Vital Voices Global Partnership now houses the Foundation and its initiatives including Women of Impact Awards, Women in the World on Campus and the solutions database that showcases nonprofits that advance women and girls.

 Women in the World.org Global Platform:  An online community and platform that maps need and resources, showcasing organizations working to advance women and girls.
The Women of Impact Awards:  Awards grants to organizations working on the ground to advance women and girls, including: Liberian Nobel laureate Leymah Gbowee; Dr. Hawa Abdi, Somali human rights activist; Dr. Kakenya Ntaiya, who runs an all-girls school in Kenya; Raquel Barros Da Silva, who works with mothers and pregnant women at risk in Brazil; Maria da Penha, a survivor of horrific domestic violence whose activism prompted the Brazilian government to enact a law toughening penalties for domestic abuse; Dona Anna Marcondes Faria, a leader and educator in Brazil’s violent, impoverished favelas; Molly Melching, for her work teaching African communities to change cultural practices that harm women such as female genital mutilation; Susana Trimarco, for her fight against human trafficking and rescues of young girls from brothels in Argentina; Ugandan chess champ Phiona Mutesi who “triumphed over daunting circumstances in Kampala” and who hopes to become a doctor; Humaira Bachal and Khalida Brohi, two young Pakistani activists who risk their lives to educate girls in Pakistan.
Women in the World Next Generation: A college campus outreach program of Women in the World connecting young female leaders to leading women in business.

References

External links
Women in the Word
Tina Brown Media
 Women in the World Chicago featuring Leymah Gbowee; YouTube

Entrepreneurship organizations
American journalism organizations
Organizations established in 2010
Women's conferences
2010 establishments in New York City